Idle No More is the eighth studio album by Canadian band King Khan and the Shrines. It was released in September 2013 under Merge Records.

Track listing

References

2013 albums
King Khan and the Shrines albums
Merge Records albums